Pays-de-Clerval (literally Land of Clerval) is a commune in the department of Doubs, eastern France. The municipality was established on 1 January 2017 by merger of the former communes of Clerval (the seat) and Santoche. On 1 January 2019, the former commune Chaux-lès-Clerval was merged into Pays-de-Clerval.

See also 
Communes of the Doubs department

References 

Communes of Doubs